Kiss the Sky is a compilation album by American rock guitarist, singer–songwriter Jimi Hendrix.  In the US, it was released by Reprise Records in October 1984 and by Polydor Records in the UK in November 1984. The album's title is taken from the lyrics of "Purple Haze."

"Red House" is listed in the liner notes as the "unedited version", which amounted to a few seconds of studio chat that preceded the song. "Stepping Stone" is believed to be the original Band of Gypsys single mix. "Killing Floor" from the 1967 Monterey Pop Festival was unreleased at the time.

The front cover artwork of the 1984 CD release on Reprise noted "Digitally remastered from original vault tapes", while the Reprise cassette cover artwork stated "Special Edition Jimi Hendrix album. Digitally remastered from original vault tapes. Audiophile qualilty recording on high-qualilty cassette".

Track listing
All songs are written by Jimi Hendrix, except where noted.

 "Are You Experienced?" – 4:15 (Are You Experienced, 1967)
 "I Don't Live Today" (live) – 6:43 (The Jimi Hendrix Concerts, 1982)
 "Voodoo Child (Slight Return)" – 5:14 (Electric Ladyland, 1968)
 "Stepping Stone" – 4:11 (single, 1970)
 "Castles Made of Sand" – 2:49 (Axis: Bold as Love, 1967)
 "Killing Floor" (live) (Chester Burnett) – 3:32 (previously unreleased)
 "Purple Haze" – 2:53 (Are You Experienced)
 "Red House" – 3:57 (Smash Hits, US edition)
 "Crosstown Traffic" – 2:20 (Electric Ladyland)
 "Third Stone from the Sun" – 6:46 (Are You Experienced)
 "All Along the Watchtower" (Bob Dylan) – 3:58 (Electric Ladyland)

Personnel
Jimi Hendrixguitar, lead vocals, backing vocals on "Crosstown Traffic", bass guitar on "All Along the Watchtower"
Noel Reddingbass guitar
Mitch Mitchelldrums
Billy Coxbass guitar on "Stepping Stone"
Buddy Milesdrums on "Stepping Stone"

Recording details
"I Don't Live Today" recorded at San Diego Sports Arena, San Diego on May 24, 1969
"Killing Floor" recorded at the Monterey Pop Festival on June 18, 1967

References 

Compilation albums published posthumously
Jimi Hendrix compilation albums
1984 compilation albums
Albums produced by Alan Douglas (record producer)
Reprise Records compilation albums